Gordon James Mote (born October 25, 1970) is an American Christian country/southern gospel singer, piano virtuoso, and worship leader. He was born blind. He has released eight studio albums. His album Don't Let Me Miss the Glory (2007) was his breakthrough on the Billboard charts.

Early life
Mote was born, on October 25, 1970, in Gadsden, Alabama, as a blind person, where he grew up in nearby Attalla. He attended both Jacksonville State University, where he spent the first three years of his music education, while he transferred to Belmont University in Nashville, Tennessee, where he graduated with honors in music.

Music career
Just after graduating, Lee Greenwood asked Mote to join his band. Since then, he has toured with artists such as Trisha Yearwood, Tanya Tucker, Porter Wagoner, the Gaither Vocal Band, and the Gaither Homecoming Tour. In 2001, when a pianist was needed for Alan Jackson's "Where Were You (When the World Stopped Turning)" recording, Mote was recommended. After that, he became a very sought-after studio musician, playing on numerous country and gospel artist's albums.

His studio album, Don't Let Me Miss the Glory, was his debut as a vocalist. It was released on October 23, 2007, with Spring Hill Records. This album was his breakthrough, appearing on the Billboard magazine charts, peaking at No. 170 on the Billboard 200 and No. 10 on the Christian Albums chart.

Discography

Albums

Gaither Homecoming Video featured performances
2007: How Great Thou Art; "Shall We Gather at the River"
2008: Homecoming Picnic; "Sweet Forgiveness"
2008: Country Bluegrass Homecoming, Volume 1; "I Know Somebody Who Does"
2008: Country Bluegrass Homecoming, Volume 2; "Ain't Gonna Give Up on God"
2010: Giving Thanks; "Everything Is Beautiful"
2011: Alaskan Homecoming; "I'm Working on a Road"
2011: Majesty; "When I Lift Up My Head", "Heaven's Jubilee"
2012: Mercy Walked In

Awards and nominations

References

External links
 
 Cross Rhythms profile

1970 births
American performers of Christian music
Blind musicians
Christian country singers
Gospel music pianists
Living people
Singers from Alabama
Songwriters from Alabama
Musicians from Gadsden, Alabama
Southern gospel performers
21st-century American singers
21st-century pianists